Ivan Božić (born 8 June 1997) is a Croatian footballer who plays as a forward.

Club career

Božić made his professional debut in the Croatian First Football League for GNK Dinamo Zagreb on 6 May 2016 in a game against NK Slaven Belupo.

He joined NK Rudeš on 22 January 2019.

Honours
Dinamo Zagreb
Croatian First League: 2015–16
Croatian Cup: 2015–16

Celje
Slovenian PrvaLiga: 2019–20

References

External links

 
 

1997 births
Living people
Sportspeople from Vinkovci
Croatian footballers
Croatia youth international footballers
Association football forwards
Croatian Football League players
First Football League (Croatia) players
Slovenian PrvaLiga players
GNK Dinamo Zagreb II players
GNK Dinamo Zagreb players
NK Lokomotiva Zagreb players
NK Rudeš players
NK Celje players
Croatian expatriate footballers
Croatian expatriate sportspeople in Slovenia
Expatriate footballers in Slovenia